Number 17 is a 1928 German-British silent crime film directed by Géza von Bolváry and starring Guy Newall, Lien Deyers, and Carl de Vogt.

The film was based on the 1925 play Number 17 by Joseph Jefferson Farjeon, later adapted by Alfred Hitchcock for his film Number Seventeen (1932). The 1928 film was one of several co-productions made in the 1920s between Britain's Gainsborough Pictures and Germany's Felsom Film. It was shot at the Tempelhof Studios in Berlin. The film's sets were designed by the art director Oscar Friedrich Werndorff.

Cast

References

Bibliography

External links

Films of the Weimar Republic
1928 films
British silent feature films
German silent feature films
German crime films
British crime films
Films directed by Géza von Bolváry
British films based on plays
Films set in England
1928 crime films
German black-and-white films
British black-and-white films
1920s British films
Films shot at Tempelhof Studios
1920s German films